Spanish Bitch is an album by American jazz pianist Mal Waldron recorded in 1970 and released on the ECM label. The album was the second recording on the influential European jazz label but only released in Japan.

Track listing 
All compositions by Mal Waldron except as indicated
 "Spanish Bitch"
 "Eleanor Rigby" (John Lennon, Paul McCartney)
 "Black Chant"
 "All That Funk"

Personnel 
 Mal Waldron — piano
 Isla Eckinger — bass
 Fred Braceful — drums

References 

ECM Records albums
Mal Waldron albums
1970 albums
Albums produced by Manfred Eicher